The 449th Expeditionary Flying Training Squadron is a provisional United States Air Force unit assigned to the 322d Air Expeditionary Group. In 2008, it was converted to an expeditionary unit on provisional status for activation by Air Combat Command any time after 28 October 2008. Its current status is undetermined.

The squadron most recently was assigned to the 323d Flying Training Wing based at Mather Air Force Base, California. It operated T-37 Tweet and T-43 Bobcat aircraft conducting flight training for members of the United States military and foreign allies.

History

World War II
Established as a Martin B-26 Marauder medium bomber squadron in mid-1942; trained under Third Air Force in Florida. Deployed to European Theater of Operations, being assigned to VIII Bomber Command 3d Bombardment Wing in England. Engaged in attacks on enemy targets in France and the Low Countries; being reassigned to IX Bomber Command in 1943 with the establishment of Ninth Air Force in England. Also supported VIII Bomber Command strategic bombardment raids in Occupied Europe and Nazi Germany, attacking enemy airfields to disrupt interceptor attacks on heavy bomber formations and destroy enemy interceptor aircraft on the ground before they could be launched.

After D-Day deployed to Advanced Landing Grounds in France and later Belgium. Provided tactical air support and bombardment of enemy strong points and military targets to disrupt resistance to Allied ground forces advancing from the French invasion beaches and the ensuing offensives on the continent; 1944–1945. Attacked enemy forces as part of the Western Allied invasion of Germany, 1945 and continued offensive tactical operations in support of ground forces until German capitulation in May 1945.

Became part of the United States Air Forces in Europe army of occupation in Germany during 1945. Demobilized in place and personnel returned to the United States in the fall of 1945; squadron inactivated as a paper unit in December 1945.

Air Force reserve
Reactivated as a reserve air training command squadron; assigned and performed advanced flight training for air cadets, 1947–1949. Inactivated due to funding restrictions.

Navigator training
Reactivated in 1972 as an Air Training Command navigator training squadron. It conducted undergraduate navigator training for USAF, United States Navy, United States Marine Corps, and United States allies from, 1973–1992.

Lineage
 Constituted as the 449th Bombardment Squadron (Medium) on 19 June 1942
 Activated on 17 July 1942
 Redesignated 449th Bombardment Squadron, Medium on 20 August 1943
 Inactivated on 11 December 1945
 Redesignated 449th Bombardment Squadron, Light on 13 August 1947
 Activated in the reserve on 4 October 1947
 Inactivated on 27 June 1949
 Redesignated 449th Flying Training Squadron on 28 July 1972
 Activated on 1 April 1973
 Inactivated on 31 May 1993
 Redesignated 449th Expeditionary Flying Training Squadron and converted to provisional status on 28 October 2008

Assignments
 322d Bombardment Group, 17 July 1942 – 11 December 1945
 322d Bombardment Group, 4 October 1947 – 27 June 1949
 323d Flying Training Wing, 1 April 1973
 323d Operations Group, 15 December 1991 – 31 May 1993
 Air Combat Command, to activate or inactivate at any time after 28 October 2008

Stations

 MacDill Field, Florida, 17 July 1942
 Drane Field, Florida, 22 September 1942
 Camp Kilmer, New Jersey, 15–23 November 1942
 RAF Bury St Edmunds (Rougham Airdrome) (AAF-468), England, 1 December 1942
 RAF Great Saling (later RAF Andrews Field) (AAF-485), England, 12 June 1943
 Beauvais/Tille Airfield (A-61), France, 29 September 1944
 Le Culot Airfield (A-89), Belgium, 31 March 1945
 Hanau-Langendiebach Airfield (Y-91), Germany, July 1945

 Fritzlar Airfield (Y-86), Germany, September 1945
 Clastres Airfield (A-71), France, c. 1 October–3 December 1945
 Camp Kilmer, New Jersey, 9–11 December 1945
 Northeast Municipal Airport, Philadelphia, Pennsylvania, 4 October 1947 – 27 June 1949
 Mather Air Force Base, California, 1 April 1973 – 31 May 1993

Aircraft

 Martin B-26 Marauder (1942–1945)
 North American AT-6 Texan (1947–1949)
 Beechcraft AT-11 Kansan (1947–1949)
 Convair T-29 Flying Classroom (1973–1974)
 Cessna T-37 Tweet (1974–1992)
 Boeing T-43 Bobcat (1973–1992)

References

Notes
 Explanatory notes

 Citations

Bibliography

 
 
 

0449
Military units and formations in California